Paul Simpson is an English musician, vocalist, lyricist and writer from Liverpool, England, best known for his work with the Wild Swans and Care. Musically, his contributions have crossed the genres of synth-pop, post-punk, neo-psychedelia, new wave and ambient.

Career
Born in Huyton, Simpson studied at Hugh Baird College in Bootle, and later shared a flat (vacated by Julian Cope and his first wife after they broke up) on Devonshire Road with Pete de Freitas (and later Courtney Love).

His music career began in the mid-1970s punk rock band Psycho Mesh, after which he joined up with his school friend Will Sergeant as Industrial Domestic, and then the bedsit collaboration with Cope, Ian McCulloch and others under the name 'A Shallow Madness'. This later transformed into the Cope-led Teardrop Explodes, while McCulloch went on to form Echo & the Bunnymen.

He left the Teardrops in 1979 to form his own band the Wild Swans in 1980. Between the two incarnations of the band, he was also co-founder of the duo Care with Ian Broudie, later of the Lightning Seeds.

Care broke up around 1984 and after a while, he and a Mark II version of the Wild Swans reformed to record 1988's Bringing Home the Ashes and 1989's Space Flower.

After the Wild Swans split in 1990, Simpson embarked on a variety of more-or-less solo projects, including 'The White Capsule', the ambient instrumental 'Skyray', and the spoken work project The Dream Diaries, which came out of his fellowship at John Moores University.

Simpson re-formed the Wild Swans in 2009 with original member Ged Quinn, releasing a third studio album in 2011. After a virus contracted in Sri Lanka damaged his lungs, he stopped singing and has focused on instrumental pieces and writing.

For several years, he worked on his crowdfunded autobiography, Incandescent.

Discography

Albums
The Dream Diaries (2005), Astral Girl
Man in a Burning Anorak – Vol 1 (2010), Astral Girl
Man in a Burning Anorak – Vol 2 (2010), Astral Girl

as Skyray
"Invisible" (1996), Ochre
Tranquilliser (1996), Ochre
"Neptune Variations" (1997), Ochre
"Womb" (1999), Space Age
Mind Lagoons (1999), Ochre
Slow Dissolve (2000), Magnetic
Ice Rink Music (2004), Astral Girl
Liquid Crystal Display (2005), Astral Girl

with The Teardrop Explodes
"When I Dream" single (1979), Zoo

with The Wild Swans
see The Wild Swans (band)#Discography

with Care
see Care (band)#Discography

with The Serpents
You Have Just Been Poisoned (1998), Ochre

References

External links

Interview 1

Year of birth missing (living people)
Living people
People from Huyton
English new wave musicians
Musicians from Liverpool
English male singer-songwriters
The Wild Swans members
The Teardrop Explodes members
Male new wave singers
British post-punk musicians